Sturgeon Lake Caldera is a large extinct caldera complex in Kenora District of Northwestern Ontario, Canada. It is one of the world's best preserved mineralized Neoarchean caldera complexes, containing well-preserved mafic-intermediate pillow lavas, pillow breccias, hyaloclastite and peperites, submarine lava domes and dome-associated breccia deposits.

Geology
The Sturgeon Lake Caldera contains a well preserved north facing homoclinal chain of greenschist facies metamorphosed intrusive, volcanic, and sedimentary layers. Episodes of subaerial and subaqueous explosive felsic volcanism created rhyodacitic to rhyolitic tuffs and lapilli tuffs. The caldera complex lies in the Wabigoon greenstone belt.

It hosts the 12-Mt Mattabi massive sulfide deposit which is interpreted to have formed on and below the seafloor, the latter through the processes of pore-space filling and replacement.

See also
Volcanism of Canada
Volcanism of Eastern Canada
List of volcanoes in Canada

References

 CAT.INIST - Sturgeon Lake Caldera Complex

External links
 Oxygen Isotope Studies of the Archean Sturgeon Lake Caldera Complex, Northern Ontario

Calderas of Ontario
Complex volcanoes
Archean calderas
Lava domes
VEI-6 volcanoes
Polygenetic volcanoes
Landforms of Kenora District
Neoarchean volcanism